HMS Seadog was a third-batch S-class submarine built for the Royal Navy during World War II. Completed in September 1942, she spent most of her career in Arctic waters, off Norway, but sank only one German ship in 13 patrols. In January 1945, she was redeployed to the Far East, meeting more success. On her first patrol in the area, the submarine rescued four American airmen. After two patrols, she and her sister ship  sank five sailing vessels, two coasters, a barge, a tugboat and a Japanese tank landing ship. After the war ended, Seadog was sent back to England, placed in reserve, then sold for scrap in December 1947. She was ultimately broken up in August 1948.

Design and description
The S-class submarines were designed to patrol the restricted waters of the North Sea and the Mediterranean Sea. The third batch was slightly enlarged and improved over the preceding second batch of the S class. They displaced  on the surface and  submerged. The S-class submarines had a crew of 48 officers and ratings.

For surface running, the boats were powered by two  diesel engines, each driving one propeller shaft. When submerged each propeller was driven by a  electric motor. They could reach  on the surface and  underwater.

The boats were armed with seven  torpedo tubes. A half-dozen of these were in the bow and there was one external tube in the stern. They carried six reload torpedoes for the bow tubes for a grand total of thirteen torpedoes. Twelve mines could be carried in lieu of the internally stowed torpedoes. They were also armed with a  deck gun. The third-batch S-class boats were fitted with either a Type 129AR or 138 ASDIC system and a Type 291 or 291W early-warning radar.

Construction and career
HMS Seadog was a third-batch S-class submarine and was ordered by the British Admiralty on 2 April 1940. She was laid down in the Cammell Laird shipyard in Birkenhead on 31 December 1940 and was launched on 11 June 1942. On 22 September 1942, Seadog, under the command of Lieutenant Anthony Daniel, sailed to Holy Loch, where she was commissioned into the Royal Navy two days later. The submarine was named after a term for old seasoned sailors; thus far, she has been the only ship to bear the name "Seadog".

Between November 1942 and February 1943, Seadog conducted three patrols off Norway, protecting Arctic convoys to and from Northern Russia, but did not sight any potential targets. After her first patrol, the boat was commanded by Desmond Martin. Returning from these operations, the submarine docked in Ardrossan to have a  Oerlikon light anti-aircraft gun added aft of the conning tower and additional equipment installed.

After her refit, Seadog departed port on 2 June 1943 on an anti-submarine patrol in Arctic waters, off Norway. Seadog returned from patrol on 18 June.

The submarine conducted another patrol in the Arctic, taking part in Operation Corncrake, picking up Norwegian commandos on the island of Spitsbergen, and missed another German U-boat. Seadog commenced another anti-submarine patrol on 3 August, this time in the Bay of Biscay. On 13 August, the submarine stopped and boarded the small French fishing vessel St. Moquet, interrogated its crew, and examined its papers. They then released the ship and were given 12 tunas, which "made a nice meal". The submarine then returned to England on 17 August.

Between mid-September and early December 1943, Seadog conducted three patrols off Norway, but was unsuccessful in spotting targets; during her first, she landed a relief force on Spitsbergen. The submarine departed on another patrol on 24 December, operating off Stadlandet, Norway, meeting more luck—after four days at sea, she sank the German transport Oldenburg with a full salvo of six torpedoes; a depth charge counter-attack by the ship's escort followed, but did not cause damage. Seadog later attacked two other convoys, but missed. Out of torpedoes, the boat returned to Lerwick, on 4 January 1944.

Far East
After two more patrols in the North, Seadog was redeployed to the Far East, passing through Gibraltar, Malta, and the Suez Canal. She arrived at Trincomalee, Ceylon on 17 January 1945, after which she briefly underwent training. A month later, the boat departed for a patrol in the Gulf of Bengal; on 26 February, she rescued four US airmen in the Bay of Bengal, and rendezvoused with a Consolidated PBY Catalina to transfer them. Seadog then damaged with gunfire and possibly destroyed a Japanese coastal trading vessel on 6 March, before returning to port on 12 March.

On her next patrol, the submarine sank a coaster with torpedoes off Ulèë Lheuë, Sumatra, and a sailing vessel near Sigli. On the 24 and 26 July, she sank two Japanese sailing vessels, and the next day she attacked and destroyed a Japanese tank landing craft with Shalimar. There is also a report of Seadog sinking the Japanese minelayer Kuroshio No. 1 on 27 July, but this is not mentioned in the submarine's log book. After sinking another sailing vessel in the evening, the two submarines went on to sink two coasters, a barge, two sailing vessels, and a tugboat, all with their deck guns, before returning to port on 12 August. Three days later, Imperial Japan announced it would surrender, and Seadog was sent back to Great Britain, passing through Suez and Gibraltar, and arriving on 18 October.

After the war, Seadog was placed in reserve, then was sold for scrap metal on 24 December 1947. She was broken up at Troon, Scotland, in August 1948.

Career Summary

Notes

References
 
  
 
 
 

 

British S-class submarines (1931)
1942 ships
World War II submarines of the United Kingdom
Royal Navy ship names
Ships built on the River Mersey